Richard Channing Garfield (born June 26, 1963) is an American mathematician, inventor and game designer. Garfield created Magic: The Gathering, which is considered to be the first collectible card game (CCG). Magic debuted in 1993 and its success spawned many imitations. Garfield oversaw the successful growth of Magic and followed it with other game designs. Included in these are Keyforge, Netrunner, BattleTech(CCG), Vampire: The Eternal Struggle, Star Wars Trading Card Game, The Great Dalmuti, Artifact and the board game RoboRally. He also created a variation of the card game Hearts called Complex Hearts. Garfield first became passionate about games when he played the roleplaying game Dungeons & Dragons, so he designed Magic decks to be customizable like roleplaying characters. Garfield and Magic are both in the Adventure Gaming Hall of Fame.

Early life, family and education
Garfield was born in Philadelphia and spent his childhood in many locations throughout the world as a result of his father's work in architecture. His family eventually settled in Oregon when he was twelve. Garfield is the great-great-grandson of U.S. President James A. Garfield and his grand-uncle Samuel Fay invented the paper clip. He is also the nephew of Fay Jones, who, already an established artist, illustrated one Magic card for him.

While Garfield always had an interest in puzzles and games, his passion was kick-started when he was introduced to Dungeons & Dragons. Garfield designed his first game when he was 13.

In 1985, Garfield received a Bachelor of Science degree in computer mathematics. After college, he joined Bell Laboratories, but soon after decided to continue his education and attended the University of Pennsylvania, studying combinatorial mathematics for his PhD. Garfield studied under Herbert Wilf and earned a Ph.D. in combinatorial mathematics from Penn in 1993. His thesis was On the Residue Classes of Combinatorial Families of Numbers. Shortly thereafter, he became a Visiting Professor of mathematics at Whitman College in Walla Walla, Washington.

Game design career

Precursors and development of Magic: the Gathering
While searching for a publisher for RoboRally, which he designed in 1985, Wizards of the Coast began talking to Garfield through Mike Davis, but the game looked too expensive for a new company like Wizards to produce. Peter Adkison of Wizards of the Coast expressed interest in a fast-playing game with minimal equipment, something that would be popular at a game convention. Adkison asked Garfield to develop a game that was cheaper to produce than RoboRally, that might be more portable and even easy to carry around to conventions; Garfield did have an idea about combining baseball cards with a card game and began turning that rough idea into a complete game over the next week. 

Garfield built on older prototypes of games that dated back to at least 1982, when he had created a Cosmic Encounter-inspired card game called "Five Magics." Garfield thus combined ideas from two previous games to invent the first trading card game, Magic: The Gathering. At first, Garfield and Adkison called the game "Manaclash," and worked on it in secret during Palladium's lawsuit against Wizards, protecting the game's intellectual property under a shell company called Garfield Games. Garfield began designing Magic as a Penn graduate student.  Garfield's playtesters were mostly fellow Penn students.

Wizards of the Coast
Magic: The Gathering launched in 1993. Playtesters began independently developing expansion packs, which were then passed to Garfield for his final edit. In June 1994, Garfield left academia to join Wizards of the Coast as a full-time game designer. Garfield managed the hit game wisely, balancing player experience with business needs and allowing other designers to contribute creatively to the game. With his direction, Wizards established a robust tournament system for Magic, something that was new to hobby gaming.

Wizards finally published Garfield's RoboRally in 1994. Wizards published Garfield's Vampire: The Masquerade-based CCG Jyhad in 1994, but changed the name to Vampire: The Eternal Struggle in 1995 to avoid offending Muslims. Netrunner (1996) was Garfield's CCG based on Cyberpunk 2020, where he included an element that made it an entirely asymmetrical game, with the two players having different cards, abilities, and goals. Wizards published the BattleTech Collectible Card Game in 1996, based on Garfield's design. Peter Adkison was developing a Dungeons & Dragons MMORPG based on a design from Garfield and Skaff Elias, but left Wizards in December 2000 after Hasbro sold the D&D computer rights and cancelled the project.

In 1999, Garfield was inducted into the Adventure Gaming Hall of Fame alongside Magic. He was a primary play tester for the Dungeons & Dragons 3rd edition bookset, released by Wizards in 2000. He eventually left Wizards to become an independent game designer.

As an independent designer 
He still sporadically contributes to Magic: The Gathering. More recently, he has created the board games Pecking Order (2006) and Rocketville (2006). The latter was published by Avalon Hill, a subsidiary of Wizards of the Coast. He has shifted more of his attention to video games, having worked on the design and development of Schizoid and Spectromancer as part of Three Donkeys LLC. He has been a game designer and consultant for companies including Electronic Arts and Microsoft.

Garfield taught a class titled "The Characteristics of Games" at the University of Washington. It is now taught as part of the University of Washington's Certificate in Game Design.

Games designed

A partial list of games designed by Garfield:

 Magic: The Gathering (1993), collectible card game
 RoboRally (1994), board game
 Vampire: The Eternal Struggle (1994), collectible card game
 The Great Dalmuti (1995), card game
 Netrunner (1996), collectible card game
 BattleTech (1996), collectible card game
 Dilbert: Corporate Shuffle (1997), card game
 Filthy Rich (1998), board game
 Twitch (1998), card game
 Star Wars Trading Card Game (2002), collectible card game
 Pecking Order (2006), board game
 Rocketville (2006), board game
 Stonehenge (2007), board game anthology
 Spectromancer (2008), online card game
 Schizoid (2008), console action game
 Kard Combat (2011), iOS Game
 King of Tokyo (2011), board game
 SolForge (2012), online digital card game
 Ghooost! (2013), card game
 King of New York (2014), board game
 Treasure Hunter (2015), board game
 SpyNet (2016), card game
 Bunny Kingdom (2017), board game
 Artifact (2018), digital trading card game
 KeyForge (2018), unique deck game
 Half Truth (2019), co-created with Ken Jennings, a party trivia game
 Carnival Of Monsters (2019) Kickstarted (failed) and eventually released through AMIGO Games
 The Hunger (2021), board game
 Mindbug (2021), card game
 Roguebook (2021), roguelike deck-building game
 King of Monster Island (2022), cooperative board game.

References

Further reading

External links

1963 births
20th-century American mathematicians
American game designers
Board game designers
Collectible card games
Richard
Living people
Magic: The Gathering
Mathematicians from Philadelphia
People from Oregon
University of Pennsylvania alumni
University of Washington faculty
Whitman College faculty
21st-century American inventors